Malabia may refer to:

 José Severo Malabia (1787 - 1849), a Bolivian-born statesman and lawyer
 Malabia (Buenos Aires Metro), a station on line B of the Buenos Aires metro